Dracaena steudneri, the  northern large-leaved dragon-tree, is a species of flowering plant in the family Asparagaceae, found from Ethiopia to southern tropical Africa. It is being investigated for its high-quality fiber content. It is fed upon by larvae of the bush nightfighter, Artitropa erinnys. In the past the name Dracaena steudneri was erroneously assigned to the well-known ornamental and house plant Dracaena fragrans, called the cornstalk dracaena, striped dracaena, compact dracaena, and corn plant, leading to much confusion.

References

steudneri
Flora of Ethiopia
Flora of South Sudan
Flora of the Democratic Republic of the Congo
Flora of Rwanda
Flora of Burundi
Flora of East Tropical Africa
Flora of South Tropical Africa
Plants described in 1895